Fauskevåg is a village in Harstad Municipality in Troms og Finnmark county, Norway. The population (2001) of Fauskevåg is 341. The village has an elementary school called Fauskevåg skole with grades 1 through 4.

Fauskevåg is located near the islands of Grasholman, a popular beach and recreation area, so tourism is important in Fauskevåg during the months of June and July. The village is located nearby the villages of Sørvika, Sandtorg, and Kilbotn.

References

Villages in Troms
Populated places of Arctic Norway
Harstad